Blood and Smoke (1999) is an audiobook in which Stephen King reads three of his own short stories. At the time, King said that the two short stories which had not been published wouldn't be, but all three appeared in the Everything's Eventual collection.

All three stories in Blood and Smoke involve smoking in one way or another. The audiobook packaging resembles a pack of cigarettes, including the flip top.

Short stories
 Lunch at the Gotham Café
 1408
 In the Deathroom

See also

Short fiction by Stephen King

External links
Audiobooks For Soul

1999 short story collections
Audiobooks
Short story collections by Stephen King
Simon & Schuster books